Philip Pryor (December 22, 1777 – June 17, 1825) was an American planter, soldier and politician.

War of 1812 
Pryor served as Captain of a cavalry company with the 1st Regiment (Byrne's), Virginia Militia, during the War of 1812 and participated in the Battle of Hampton on June 25, 1813.  A letter from Major Stapelton Crutchfield to Governor of Virginia James Barbour, recounting the circumstances of the battle and Captain Pryor's actions, was read to the Virginia House of Delegates on June 25, 1813.

Political career 
Pryor served in the Virginia House of Delegates from 1808 to 1814. He served on the Committee of Propositions and Grievances and the Committee of Claims. On January 17, 1811, Pryor voted in favor of a non-binding resolution instructing Virginia's U.S. congressional delegation to oppose the renewal of the charter of the First Bank of the United States.

Marriage and family 
On July 5, 1802, Pryor married Susan Cordle Wilkes (September 2, 1786 - May 22, 1842), daughter of Burwell Bassett Wilkes and Susan Cordle, Brunswick County, Virginia.  Susan and Philip Pryor had seven children together.  He was the father of Dr. Samuel B. Pryor (August 19, 1820 - October 18, 1866), the first mayor of Dallas, Texas (1856), and Dr. Charles R. Pryor (November 2, 1822 - August 26, 1882), who was editor of the Dallas Herald and Secretary of State of the Confederate state of Texas during the American Civil War.

Early life and ancestry 
Pryor was born in 1777, the son of John Pryor of Amelia County, Virginia (died 1785) and Ann Bland (1735-1785). He was a grandson of Richard Bland (1710-1776) and Ann Poythress (1712-1758), and both his maternal and paternal ancestors were descended from Jamestown, Virginia colonists.  His nephew was U.S. Senator Luke Pryor (1820-1900), son of Luke Pryor. Other prominent Virginia ancestors included Richard Bland (burgess), Theodorick Bland of Westover, Richard Bennett (governor) and William Randolph.

References 

 https://history.house.virginia.gov/members/1039
 https://www.familysearch.org/ark:/61903/3:1:33S7-95ZF-V48?i=1192&cc=1916219&personaUrl=%2Fark%3A%2F61903%2F1%3A1%3AQ29K-L1ST
 Library of Virginia, War of 1812 Pay Rolls and Muster Rolls; https://lva.primo.exlibrisgroup.com/discovery/sourceRecord?vid=01LVA_INST:01LVA&docId=alma990006462960205756&recordOwner=01LVA_INST
 https://www.hmdb.org/m.asp?m=76817
 https://babel.hathitrust.org/cgi/pt?id=nyp.33433014925345&view=1up&seq=20&skin=2021&q1=pryor
 https://tennesseepryors.com/pryors-in-the-war-of-1812/# https://tennesseepryors.com/affluent-pryor-families-in-virginia/
 https://web.archive.org/web/20130204203814/http://www.tnpryors.com/states_census/va_a-d.html#Brunswick
 https://www.findagrave.com/memorial/187605308/charles-r_-pryor
 https://www.familysearch.org/ark:/61903/3:1:S3HY-6SNW-SVZ?i=383&cc=3940896&personaUrl=%2Fark%3A%2F61903%2F1%3A1%3ADS9Y-L5W2
 https://books.google.com/books?id=ixztrMY3EjIC&pg=PA111&lpg=PA111&dq=john+pryor+1785&source=bl&ots=EHQfhGTDtw&sig=ACfU3U1egbYBlRqBapgwGYNihYAp848Jvg&hl=en&sa=X&ved=2ahUKEwiWgv-vhOf2AhWCVt8KHd2uCLEQ6AF6BAgOEAM#v=onepage&q=john%20pryor%201785&f=false
 http://encyclopediaofalabama.org/article/h-2976
 https://www.jstor.org/stable/4242227?seq=3# 
 http://image.lva.virginia.gov/BibleII/25295a/p/0001.tif
 http://image.lva.virginia.gov/BibleII/25295a/p/0002.tif
 http://image.lva.virginia.gov/BibleII/25295a/p/0003.tif

1777 births
1825 deaths